Patrick McCarthy may refer to:

Music
 Patrick McCarthy (conductor), English conductor and singer
 Pat McCarthy (record producer), record producer from Dublin, Ireland

Politics
 Patrick J. McCarthy (1848–1921), mayor of Providence, Rhode Island 1907–1909
 P. H. McCarthy (Patrick Henry McCarthy, 1863–1933), labor leader in San Francisco and mayor from 1910 to 1912
 Patrick McCarthy (politician), Northern Irish politician

Sports
 Patrick McCarthy (announcer) (born 1995), sports broadcaster
 Pat McCarthy (cricketer) (1919–2007), cricketer for Ceylon and Western Australia
 Pat McCarthy (Welsh footballer) (1888–?), Welsh footballer
 Pat McCarthy (Gaelic footballer) (born 1950), Irish former Gaelic footballer
 Paddy McCarthy (born 1983), Irish footballer, currently playing for Crystal Palace
 Patrick McCarthy (Australian footballer) (born 1992), footballer for Carlton in the Australian Football League

Others
 Patrick McCarthy (judge) (born 1952), Irish judge and former barrister
 Patrick M. McCarthy (surgeon), American cardiac surgeon
 Patrick M. McCarthy (lawyer), American lawyer and United States Navy officer
 Patrick McCarthy (publisher) (1951–2019), W magazine publisher

See also
 Pat McCarthy (disambiguation)